Qapulukh (also Romanized as Qāpūlūkh) is a village in Koshksaray Rural District, in the Central District of Marand County, East Azerbaijan Province, Iran. At the time of the 2006 census, its population consisted of 548 people spread across 120 families.

References 

Populated places in Marand County